Sage Kotsenburg (born July 27, 1993) is an American snowboarder. He won the first-ever Olympic gold medal in men's snowboard slopestyle at the 2014 Winter Olympic Games in Sochi, Russia, and became the first gold medalist at these Olympics. Kotsenburg won a silver medal in snowboard slopestyle at the 2012 Winter X Games XVI in Aspen, Colorado, behind Mark McMorris. Kotsenburg won a bronze medal in Snowboard Big Air at the 2011 Winter X Games XV in Aspen, Colorado, behind Torstein Horgmo and Sebastien Toutant.

Personal life
Kotsenburg was born in Coeur d'Alene, Idaho, but grew up in Park City, Utah. His parents are Carol Ann and Steve Kotsenburg. His father is a real estate agent. He has two older brothers, and a younger sister. Sage started snowboarding at the age of five with older brother, Blaze.  The three younger siblings snowboard together.  Their mother acts as Sage's travel agent.

Kotsenburg was homeschooled via the Alpha Omega Academy. He graduated in 2011.

Career
Kotsenburg made his US Open debut at the age of 12. At age 16, he won the slopestyle silver at the European X Games 2010.

He landed the first-ever Cab double cork 1440 at Air & Style in Innsbruck in February 2011, took third at the 2011 Arctic Challenge, and was named to the U.S. Snowboarding Slopestyle Pro Team in December 2011.

He won the Winter X Games XVI Slopestyle silver in 2012.

Kotsenburg won slopestyle gold at the 2014 Sochi Olympics, nailing one trick he had never tried before and performing an original grab he invented, the "Holy Crail". He was the first gold medalist of the Olympic Games as well as the first medal for the United States.

During the summer, Kotsenburg trains on Mt. Hood at High Cascade Snowboard Camp. For summer 2014, Kotsenburg and his Lick the Cat crew have been awarded a Signature Session.

References

External links

US Snowboarding Profile
Sochi Olympics profile

1993 births
Living people
American male snowboarders
X Games athletes
Snowboarders at the 2014 Winter Olympics
Medalists at the 2014 Winter Olympics
Olympic gold medalists for the United States in snowboarding
Olympic medalists in snowboarding
Sportspeople from Idaho
People from Coeur d'Alene, Idaho
Sportspeople from Utah
People from Park City, Utah
20th-century American people
21st-century American people